Li Zicheng (22 September 1606 – 1645), born Li Hongji, also known by the nickname, Dashing King, was a Chinese peasant rebel leader who overthrew the Ming dynasty in 1644 and ruled over northern China briefly as the emperor of the short-lived Shun dynasty before his death a year later.

Biography
Li Zicheng was born in 1606 as Li Hongji to an impoverished family of farmers in Li Jiqian village, Yan'an prefecture, northeast Shaanxi province. Li Zicheng had a brother who was 20 years his senior and raised Li Zicheng alongside his son and Zicheng’s nephew, Li Guo. While Li Zicheng was literate, the source of his education is disputed. Over the course of his late adolescence and early adulthood, Li worked on a farm, in a wine shop, in a blacksmith's shop, and as a mailman for the state courier system.

According to folklore, in 1630, Li was put on public display in an iron collar and shackles for failing to repay loans to a usurious magistrate. The magistrate, a man by the name of Ai, struck a guard who tried to give Li shade and water. A group of sympathetic peasants freed Li from his shackles, spirited him to a nearby hill, and proclaimed him their leader. Although they were only armed with wooden sticks, Li and his band managed to ambush a group of government soldiers sent to arrest them, and obtained their first real weapons.

By the late Ming dynasty era, the government had been weakened financially, and struggled to deal with the economic issues, environmental problems, and widespread disease (smallpox and possibly the plague) that afflicted peasant populations. In 1639, an epidemic that would later become known as the "Chongzhen Great Plague" hit the Yangzi region and spread across the north. Famine and drought compounded the social discontent caused by the epidemic. Environmental disaster, disease, and the failure of the Chongzhen government to protect its people led to major peasant uprisings across Northern China beginning in 1628, with the Shaanxi province as an epicenter of rebellion. Li Zicheng and Zhang Xianzhong, also from Shaanxi province, were two of the major leaders in the peasant rebellions under the late Ming dynasty.

In 1633, Li joined a rebel army led by Gao Yingxiang (高迎祥), nicknamed "Dashing King.” He inherited Gao's nickname and command of the rebel army after Gao's death.

Within three years, Li succeeded in rallying more than 30,000 men to form a rebel army. They attacked and killed prominent government officials, such as Sun Chuanting, in the Henan, Shanxi, and Shaanxi provinces. As Li won more battles and gained more support, his army grew larger. Historians attribute this growth in numbers to Li’s reputation as a Robin Hood style figure who showed compassion to the poor and only attacked Ming officials.

Li advocated the slogan of "dividing land equally and abolishing the grain taxes payment system" which won great support from the peasants. The song of "killing cattle and sheep, preparing tasty wine and opening the city gate to welcome the Dashing King" was widely spread at that time.

The 1642 Kaifeng flood, caused by breaches of the Yellow River dikes by both sides, ended the siege of Kaifeng and killed over 300,000 of its 378,000 residents. After the battles of Luoyang and Kaifeng, the Ming government was unable to stop Li's rebellion, as most of its military force was involved in the battle against the Manchus in the north.

In 1643, Li captured Xiangyang and proclaimed himself "King of Xinshun" (新順王).

In April 1644, Li's rebels sacked the Ming capital of Beijing, and the Chongzhen Emperor committed suicide. Li proclaimed himself the emperor of the Shun dynasty. Li, as all contenders for the throne were required, claimed to have the Mandate of Heaven bestowed upon him. Firstly, Li was Han Chinese and hailed from the Shaanxi province of China, which strengthened his legitimacy to the throne versus the foreign Manchus. Li also gained the support of scholar officials which was important in leading over the people of China as a Confucian state. The name of the dynasty is translated to mean "Obedient to Heaven".

Li's army was defeated on 27 May 1644 at the Battle of Shanhai Pass by the combined forces of the defecting Ming general Wu Sangui and Prince Dorgon leading the Manchus. The Ming and Manchu forces captured Beijing on 6 June and Fulin ascended to the throne to establish the Shunzhi reign with Dorgon as regent.

When Wu Sangui and Prince Dorgon took control of Beijing, Li fled to Xi'an in Shaanxi. It is not exactly known how or if Li died in this period, and there are multiple accounts of his death which vary and some are exaggerated by folklore. Across multiple sources, the year of his death is said to be in 1645. One account states that in the summer of 1645 Li went to raid a village in search of sustenance with his remaining followers and was killed by soldiers guarding the village.  Another theory was that Li Zicheng became a monk and died in 1674.

Historiography 
Although the success of the Ming-Qing transition was attributed to the weakening of the Ming dynasty (exacerbated by Li Zicheng's rebellion), official historiography during the Qing dynasty regarded Li as an illegitimate usurper and outlaw. This view sought to discourage and demonize notions of rebellion against the Qing government, by propagating that the Manchus put an end to Li's illegitimate rule and restore peace to the empire, thus receiving the Mandate of Heaven to rule China.

In the History of Ming, Li Zicheng was described as having high cheekbones, deep-set eyes and a jackal-like voice.

In popular culture
Li appears as a bandit in Baifa Monü Zhuan, a wuxia novel by Liang Yusheng, where the heroine comments he is worthy of being a king.
Li is featured as a character in some of the works of Hong Kong wuxia writer Jin Yong (Louis Cha). Li's rebellion against the Ming dynasty is featured in Sword Stained with Royal Blood and his personality is analysed from the point of view of Yuan Chengzhi, the protagonist. In The Deer and the Cauldron, set in the Qing dynasty during the early reign of the Kangxi Emperor, Li is revealed to have survived and fathered a daughter, A'ke, with Chen Yuanyuan. Li is also briefly mentioned by name in Fox Volant of the Snowy Mountain and The Young Flying Fox.

Li is the main character of the historical epic novel Li Zicheng by Yao Xueyin.

In folklore 
There are many stories and folklore attributed to Li Zicheng. One such story claims that when Li Zicheng was young he killed one of his classmates and was promptly disowned by his family and shunned by his community.

References

Further reading

External links
Maoist era propaganda posters glorifying Li Zicheng

1606 births
1645 deaths
People from Yan'an
Assassinated people
Deaths by blade weapons
Revolutionaries
Ming dynasty people
Qing dynasty people
Ming dynasty rebels
Chinese emperors
17th-century Chinese monarchs
Politicians from Yulin, Shaanxi
Monarchs killed in action
Shun dynasty
Founding monarchs